Dr. Fazıl Küçük Kupası is the tournament of the Cyprus Turkish Football Federation in Northern Cyprus.

Winners
1989 : Baf Ülkü Yurdu          2-1 Dogan Türk Birligi
1990 : Dogan Türk Birligi      3-1 Türk Ocagi
1991 : Baf Ülkü Yurdu          3-1 Çetinkaya Türk
1992 : Çetinkaya Türk               2-1 Gönyeli
1993 : Çetinkaya Türk               3-2 Dogan Türk Birligi 
1994 : Gönyeli                 2-0 Yalova
1995 : Gönyeli'''                 2-1 Yalova
1996 : Çetinkaya Türk 3-2 Akincilar 
1997 : Küçük Kaymakli          2-0 Gönyeli
1998 : Çetinkaya Türk               3-2 Küçük Kaymakli
1999 : Gönyeli                 3-1 Çetinkaya Türk
2000 : Çetinkaya Türk               3-0 Gönyeli
2001 : Küçük Kaymakli          2-1 Çetinkaya Türk

References 

Fazil Kucuk Kupasi